Dianthus callizonus, the beauty's girdle, is a species of flowering plant in the family Caryophyllaceae, endemic to the Piatra Craiului Mountains of Romania. Garofița Pietrei Craiului, the little carnation of Piatra Craiului, as it is known in Romanian, is a symbol of the Piatra Craiului massif and the national park of the same name.

References

callizonus
Endemic flora of Romania
Plants described in 1851
Flora of the Carpathians